The Canton of Cherbourg-Octeville-Nord-Ouest in France was situated in the department of Manche and the region of Basse-Normandie. It had 11,833 inhabitants (2012). It was disbanded following the French canton reorganisation which came into effect in March 2015. It comprised part of the commune of Cherbourg-Octeville.

References

Former cantons of Manche
Cherbourg-Octeville
2015 disestablishments in France
States and territories disestablished in 2015